The 1987 Shell Gemini 1000 Kilometers Brands Hatch was the seventh round of the 1987 World Sports-Prototype Championship.  It took place at Brands Hatch, United Kingdom on July 26, 1987.

Official results
Class winners in bold.  Cars failing to complete 75% of the winner's distance marked as Not Classified (NC).

Statistics
 Pole Position - #5 Silk Cut Jaguar - 1:14.440
 Fastest Lap - #5 Silk Cut Jaguar - 1:16.440
 Average Speed - 179.936 km/h

References

 
 

Brands Hatch
Brands Hatch
July 1987 sports events in the United Kingdom